Hendricks may refer to:

Places 
 Hendricks, Kentucky
 Hendricks, Minnesota, largest city in the U.S. with that name.
 Hendricks, West Virginia
 Hendricks County, Indiana
 Hendricks Township (disambiguation)
 Lake Hendricks

Other uses 
 Hendricks (surname)
 Hendrick's Gin

See also 

 Hendrick (disambiguation)
 Hendric
 Hendrik (disambiguation)
 Hendrickx
 Hendriks
 Hendrikx
 Hendrix (disambiguation)
 Hendryx
 Henrik
 Henry (disambiguation)
 Henryk (disambiguation)